Piesse Brook is a suburb of Perth, Western Australia in the City of Kalamunda. It was officially named in 1972, although the name had been in use since 1890 for a watercourse in the area which honoured William Roper Piesse, a prominent citizen with a large family who were based in Guildford.

References

Suburbs of Perth, Western Australia
Suburbs in the City of Kalamunda